Podplat is a small settlement in the Municipality of Rogaška Slatina in eastern Slovenia. It lies on the railway line from Celje to Rogaška Slatina and there is a small train station in the settlement. The entire area belongs to the traditional Styria region and is now included in the Savinja Statistical Region.

References

External links
Podplat on Geopedia

Populated places in the Municipality of Rogaška Slatina